Thryptomene wannooensis is a shrub species in the family Myrtaceae that is endemic to Western Australia.

The shrub is found in the Gascoyne region of Western Australia near Shark Bay.

References

wannooensis
Endemic flora of Western Australia
Rosids of Western Australia
Endangered flora of Australia
Plants described in 2014
Taxa named by Barbara Lynette Rye